The Bakil (Musnad: 𐩨𐩫𐩺𐩡) federation is the largest tribal federation in Yemen. The tribe consists of more than 10 million men and women they are the sister tribe of Hashid(4 million) whose leader was Abdullah Bin Hussein Alahmar. The member tribes of the Bakil Confederation are found primarily in the far north of the country; its leaders today are the Abo Lhom  family.

Ancient history 
Hashid and Bakil were the sons of Jashim bin Jubran bin Nawf bin Tuba'a bin Zayd bin Amro bin Hamdan. Bani Hamdan was already a well known clan in the 1st century AD and it was mentioned in Sabaean inscriptions. Therefore, Hashid and Bakil (the brothers) must have lived in the BC era. In the Middle Sabaean period (the 1st to 4th centuries CE) the Bakil confederation consisted of three sha`bs - Raydah, Amran, and Shibam.

In the 3rd century most of Hamdan migrated to Syria. Hashid and Bakil switched their alliance to Himyar.

Conversion to Islam 
In the year 622, prophet Muhammad sent Khalid ibn Al-Walid to Yemen to call them to Islam. However, Khaled managed to push the Najrani and Tihami Yemenis into Islam, but he didn't get a warm response from the Hamdani Yemenis of the highlands. So Muhammad sent over Ali ibn Abi Talib, and he was much more successful in converting the Hamdani Yemenis.

After the death of Muhammad, the Hamdan tribe remained Muslim and didn't join the ridda movement.

After Ali, power vacuum in Yemen and the Imam Hadi
The Hamdan tribe remained on the side of Ali, after the defeat of Ali and later his sons. The tribes remained on alliance to Ali but didn't oppose the Umayyads or ally themselves with the other Shias.

At that time Yemen was experiencing a great population movement forming the bulk of the Islamic Expansion mainly settling and Arabizing North Africa/Spain. However, the majority of the Hamdan tribe remained in Yemen which later helped the Hashid/Bakil Hamdani tribes become the biggest local key player, benefiting from the departure of the bulk of the most powerful Nomadic Yemeni tribes of that time into North Africa/Spain in Wetsward movements that continued until the 13th century.

By the 10th century the Imam al-Hadi Yahya bin al-Hussain bin al-Qasim (a scion of Imam al-Hasan (as), grandson of the Prophet) who, at Sa'da, in 893-7 C.E. arrived to the Northern Highlands on invitation from the Hamdan tribe and from that time till present day the Zaidi moderate Shia teachings became dominant in north Yemen.

Modern history 
Imam Yahya's campaign to subject the country, and more specifically the tribes, to his control, led him to undertake massive campaigns against their influence and power; in fact, his efforts succeeded in permanently eliminating all but two of the ancient confederations (the Hashid is the other one to survive).

Many writers have referred to the Hashid and Bakil confederations as the "two wings" of the Zaidi imamate; in the sense that many of the tribes that belong to these confederations are and were strongly committed to Zaidi Islam, the imams were recognized - to a greater or lesser degree - as the heads of the Zaidi community and could, therefore, count on a measure of support and loyalty. Not all the tribes, however, accepted the temporal and even legal role that the imams arrogated to themselves; consequently, many imams (Imam Yahya and Imam Ahmad in the twentieth century included) complained bitterly about the tribes' inordinate political power.

See also
Alliance of Yemeni Tribes
Sha'r Awtar

References

Bibliography 
Andrey Korotayev. Ancient Yemen. Oxford: Oxford University Press, 1995.

External links
Social History of Yemen

Yemeni tribes
Banu Hamdan
Federations